Amga (Amma) is a rural locality (a selo) and the administrative center of Amginsky District of the Sakha Republic, Russia, located on the Amga River. It also the only inhabited locality and the administrative center of Amginsky Rural Okrug within Amginsky District. Population:

Etymology
The name Amga is derived from an Evenk word meaning gorge or ravine.

History
It was first founded by the Cossacks in 1652 as the ostrog (fortress) of Amga-Sloboda. The first church was built in 1680, but it burned down later and was subsequently rebuilt a number of times.  Agriculture has been conducted in the area since 1695; it was the first place in Yakutia used for growing crops.

Amga was a place of political exile in the Russian Empire, with the most famous exile being Vladimir Korolenko, who was exiled here for six years in 1879.

It was also the site for fighting during the Russian Civil War.

Somewhere in the area was the old river crossing of Amginsk. From about 1750 to 1850, a horse track led northwest to Yakutsk. Across the river, one route led south to Uda Gulf and the other went southeast to Ust-Maya and from there south to Ayan. From perhaps 1662, there were a few Russian peasants in the area, but agriculture was usually unsuccessful. In 1737, Stepan Krasheninnikov noted that they had abandoned agriculture and were distinguishable from their Yakut neighbors only in religion.

Climate
Amga has an extreme subarctic climate (Köppen Dfd)

References

Notes

Sources
Official website of the Sakha Republic. Registry of the Administrative-Territorial Divisions of the Sakha Republic. Amginsky District. 

Rural localities in Amginsky District